The 1964 U.S. Women's Open was the 19th U.S. Women's Open, held July 9–12 at the San Diego Country Club in Chula Vista, California.

Hometown favorite Mickey Wright won her fourth and final U.S. Women's Open in an 18-hole playoff, two strokes ahead of runner-up  Ruth Jessen, 70 to 72. At the 72nd hole on Saturday afternoon, Jessen birdied while Wright scrambled for par from a greenside bunker to force the Sunday playoff. Both players had San Diego ties, as Wright was born and raised in the area and Jessen was a resident of Bonsall.

Jessen, originally of Seattle, was also a runner-up two years earlier in 1962. Wright, a Dallas resident, led (or co-led) after each of the five rounds to win the twelfth of her thirteen major titles. Defending champion Mary Mills finished in eleventh place.

The championship was held the same week as the Open Championship in Scotland, which concluded on Friday.

This was the last U.S. Women's Open to schedule the final two rounds for Saturday, the format since the USGA took over in 1953. In 1965, the final round was moved to Sunday, as it was from 1947 through 1952.

Past champions in the field

Source:

Final leaderboard
Saturday, July 11, 1964

Source:

Playoff
Sunday, July 12, 1964

Par: 36-37=73
Source:

References

External links
Golf Observer final leaderboard
U.S. Women's Open Golf Championship
U.S. Women's Open – past champions – 1964
San Diego Country Club

U.S. Women's Open
Golf in California
Women's sports in California
Sports in Chula Vista, California
Sports competitions in San Diego County, California
U.S. Women's Open
U.S. Women's Open
U.S. Women's Open
U.S. Women's Open